SMS G113 was an  built for the German Kaiserliche Marine (Imperial Navy) in the 1900s

Design

Displacement was  normal and  full load.

Armament consisted of three 5 cm SK L/40 guns in single mounts, together with three  torpedo tubes, with two spare torpedoes. The ship was later re-armed, with an 8.8 cm gun replacing one of the 5.0 cm guns.

Service history
G113 was launched at Germaniawerft's Kiel shipyard on 9 August 1902, and commissioned on 16 October 1902. In May 1907, she was a member of the 1st Half Flotilla. In May 1914, she was the leader of the IV Torpedoboat Flotilla (a reserve unit), and remained leader of IV Flotilla in October 1914. She was renamed T113 on 4 September 1914. In April 1915, T113 was a member of the 7th Torpedo-boat Half Flotilla, operating in the Baltic sea. By May 1916, T113 was part of a harbour protection flotilla for the Elbe and by the end of the war, was one of 36 torpedo boats forming the 1st Escort Flotilla.

Notes

References

 

 

Torpedo boats of the Imperial German Navy
1902 ships
Ships built in Kiel
World War I torpedo boats of Germany